Events from the year 1592 in France

Incumbents
 Monarch – Henry IV

Events
December 1591 to May 1592 – Siege of Rouen
21 to 24 May – Battle of Craon

Births
22 January – Pierre Gassendi, philosopher, scientist, mathematician and astronomer (died 1655)
10 July – Pierre d'Hozier, genealogist (died 1660)
1 August – François le Métel de Boisrobert, poet and playwright (died 1662)
18 September – Jean Guyon, patriarch (died 1663)
November – Françoise de Lorraine, Duchess of Vendôme (died 1669)
Approximate date – Angélique Paulet, salonnière, singer, musician and actress (died 1651)

Deaths
 
26 July – Armand de Gontaut, baron de Biron, soldier (born 1524)
13 September – Michel de Montaigne, philosopher and essayist (born 1533)
27 October – Michel de Castelnau, soldier and diplomat (born c.1520)

See also

References

1590s in France